Euplius (Euplus) (d. c. AD 304) is venerated as a martyr and saint by the Eastern Orthodox Church and the Catholic Church.

Biography
His name in Greek means "good sailing" which is played upon in the text of the Orthodox Christian Vespers service in his honor.

The Passion of Saint Euplius states that he was a deacon and that he was arrested for owning and reading from a copy of the Bible during the Diocletianic Persecution.  He was brought before the governor of the city, Calvinianus (Calvinian), who asked the saint to read him extracts from the book.  He was then tortured and beheaded.

The remains of the Saint rest in the Cathedral of the Assumption of Trevico; it is plausible that they were brought just before the Arab invasion of Sicily in the 10th century. On 5 February 1654, the Bishop of Trevico, Donato Pascasio, authorized the translation of a bone of the saint in favor of the catanese diocese.

Veneration
With Saint Agatha, he is a co-patron of Catania in Sicily. He is also the patron saint of Trevico and Francavilla di Sicilia. His feast day is August 12.

An ancient church, dating back to the 5th century, located in Catania near Piazza Stesicoro, was dedicated to him; various buildings stratified over the centuries, but during the World War II an american bombing reduced the new church, dating from the 18th century, to rubble. Today only the ancient crypt of the primitive church remains. This urban site coincides with the place of his martyrdom.

Euplio of Catania was also the object of a strong devotion in Russia. In 1471, a wooden church was erected in honor of the saint to celebrate the peace between the Grand Prince of Muscovy Ivan III and the Novgorod Republic. In 1657, Tsar Alexei I Romanov had the building rebuilt in stone. In the 18th century on the occasion of a renovation, a majestic facade was erected. The Church of St. Euplius the Archdeacon, on what is now Myasnitskaya Street in Moscow, was demolished, on Stalin's orders, in 1926.

References

External links
 Catholic Online: St. Euplius
 OCA.org: Life of St. Euplus  OCA.org: Life of St. Euplus
 http://files.oca.org/service-texts/2013-0811-texts.doc Service honoring St. Euplus
  Sant' Euplo (Euplio) di Catania
  Trevico –Le reliquie di Sant’Euplio al centro del turismo religioso

Sicilian saints
Catania
304 deaths
4th-century Christian martyrs
4th-century Romans
Year of birth unknown
Christians martyred during the reign of Diocletian